Julian Roth (September 2, 1902 – December 9, 1992) was an American architect. Following the death of his father, founder Emery Roth, he and his brother Richard took over at Emery Roth & Sons, one of the oldest and most prolific firms in New York City.

National Real Estate Investor dubbed the brothers "New York's name-brand architects, designing much of Sixth Avenue in the 1960s and 1970s." They were also a key contractor in building the World Trade Center.

Roth was also on the master list of Nixon political opponents.

References
Johnson, Ben (Sept 30, 1999). The real movers and shakers. National Real Estate Investor  
Wired New York - Emery Roth & Sons building list
Staff report (June 28, 1973). Lists of White House 'Enemies' and Memorandums Relating to Those Named. New York Times
Julian Roth's obituary at the New York Times

External links 

Records of the Watergate Special Prosecution Force 1971 to 1977 via National Archives and Records Administration

1902 births
1992 deaths
20th-century American architects
20th-century American businesspeople